Grandall Law Firm (Chinese: 国浩律师事务所), is a Chinese law firm provide full service in Chinese corporate and commercial law. Grandall has offices across 32 cities located in Beijing, Shanghai, Shenzhen, Hangzhou, Guangzhou, Kunming, Tianjin, Chengdu, Ningbo, Xi'an, Nanjing, Nanning, Fuzhou, Jinan, Chongqing, Suzhou, Changsha, Taiyuan, Wuhan, Guiyang, Urumqi, Zhengzhou, Shijiazhuang, Hefei, Hainan, Qingdao, Hong Kong, Paris, Madrid, Silicon Valley, Stockholm and New York. Being one of the largest full-service law firms in China, the firm has over 600 global partners, and alliances with over 50 top-tier international law firms. Its services are extended to 155 cities in 59 countries and regions, and has won numerous awards and honors across the globe.

History
Established in 1998 through a  merger between the then leading Chinese firms Michael Zhang & Associates in Beijing (established in 1994), Wanguo Law Firm in Shanghai (1993) and Tangren Law Firm in Shenzhen (1993), Grandall has grown from a 15 attorneys firm to now being a law firm with over 2000 lawyers in 2018.

Practice Areas
Grandall provides expert legal services in the areas of Banking and Finance, Capital Markets and Securities; Corporate and Commercial; Intellectual Property and E-Commerce; Construction and Real Estate; Power, Energy and Infrastructure; Labor and Human Resources; Dispute Resolution, Arbitration and Litigation; Aviation, Shipping and Maritime; Private Equity and Venture Capital, Tax and Trusts.

Awards
The firm received awards by All China Lawyers Association (Outstanding Law Firm of the Nation), ALB China (Insurance, Tax, and Trusts), Chambers and Partners (VC/PE-backed Domestic IPO Lead Legal Adviser of the Year 2008, Capital Markets: PRC Law: Debt & Equity), and Legal 500(M&A, Capital Markets, Energy projects).

References

External links
Grandall Law Firm - Homepage

 Law firms established in 1998
 Law firms of China